Jastrząb may refer to:

Places
Jastrząb, Przysucha County in Masovian Voivodeship (east-central Poland)
Jastrząb, Szydłowiec County in Masovian Voivodeship (east-central Poland)
Gmina Jastrząb, the administrative district centred on Jastrząb, Szydłowiec County 
Jastrząb, Silesian Voivodeship (south Poland)

Other
ORP Jastrząb, a World War II submarine of the Polish Navy
 Jastrząb, code name used for the Lockheed Martin F-16 fighter jet within the Polish Air Force.

See also